E45 may refer to:
 European route E45, a road that goes between Norway and Italy, through Finland, Sweden, Denmark, Germany and Austria.
 E45 cream, a brand of skin care products from Crookes Healthcare, a subsidiary of Reckitt Benckiser.
 The US Federal Aviation Administration airport code for Pine Mountain Lake Airport.
 E45 Bronstein (Byrne) variation, ECO code for a variation of the Nimzo-Indian chess opening.
 Sanriku Expressway (between Rifu JCT and Taro-kita IC), Sanriku-kita Jūkan Road and Hachinohe-Kuji Expressway, route E45 in Japan.